Henryk Mikołaj Górecki (6 December 1933 – 12 November 2010) was a Polish composer of contemporary classical music. This incomplete list of his compositions is sorted by opus number or date when no opus number is provided. Much of Górecki's work has been published by Boosey & Hawkes, which holds the rights for most of the world except in "countries of the former socialist copyright federation," where Polskie Wydawnictwo Muzyczne holds the rights.

Works

Published

 Four Preludes, Op. 1, piano (1955)
 Toccata for two pianos, Op. 2
 Three Songs, Op. 3 (1956)
 No. 1 Do matki – To Mother
 No. 2 Jakiż to dzwon grobowy – What was this Funeral Bell
 No. 3 Ptak – The Bird
 Variations for violin and piano, Op. 4
 Quartettino, Op. 5, two flutes, oboe, violin (1956)
 Piano Sonata No.  1, Op. 6, piano (1956, revised 1984, 1990)
 Songs of Joy and Rhythm, Op. 7, piano and chamber orchestra (1956, revised 1959)
 Sonatina in One Movement, Op. 8, violin and piano
 Lullaby for piano, Op. 9 (1956, revised 1980)
 Sonata for two violins, Op. 10 (1957)
 Concerto for five instruments and string quartet, Op. 11, mixed ensemble (1957)
 Epitafium, Op. 12, chorus and ensemble (1958)
 No. 1 Preludium
 No. 2 Chorał – Chorale
 No. 3 Antyfona – Antiphon
 No. 4 Postludium
 Five Pieces, Op. 13, piano duo (two pianos or piano four hands) (1959)
 Symphony No. 1 '1959', Op. 14, string orchestra and percussion (1959)
 Three Diagrams for solo flute, Op. 15
 Monologhi, Op. 16, soprano and three groups of instruments (1960)
 Scontri, Op. 17, full orchestra (1960)
 Diagram IV for solo flute, Op. 18 (1961)
 Genesis I: Elementi, Op. 19, string trio (1962)
 Genesis II: Canti Strumentali, Op. 19, 15 players (1962)
 Genesis III: Monodramma, Op. 19, soprano, metal percussion and six double basses (1963)
 Trzy tance w dawnym stylu (Three pieces in the old style), string orchestra, no Op. number (1963)
 Choros I, Op. 20, string orchestra (1964)
 Refrain, Op. 21, full orchestra (1965)
 Musiquette 1 for two trumpets and guitar, Op. 22 (1967)
 Musiquette 2, Op. 23, four trumpets, four trombones, two pianos, percussion (1967)
 Old Polish Music (Muzyka Staropolska), Op. 24, full orchestra (1969)
 Musiquette 3, Op. 25, viola ensemble (1967)
 Cantata for organ, Op. 26 (1968)
 Canticum Graduum, Op. 27, full orchestra (1969)
 Musiquette 4, Op. 28, trombone, clarinet, cello, piano (1970)
 Ad Matrem, Op. 29, chorus and orchestra (1971)
 Two Sacred Songs, Op. 30
 No. 1 Lento sostenuto
 No. 2 Maestoso
 Symphony No. 2 'Copernican', Op. 31, chorus and orchestra (1972)
 Euntes Ibant et Flebant, Op. 32, chorus a cappella (1972)
 Two Little Songs of Tuwim, Op. 33, chorus a cappella (1972)
 No. 1 Rok i bieda – The Year and Hardship
 No. 2 Ptasie plotki – Bird Gossip
 Three Dances, Op. 34, full orchestra (1973)
 Amen, Op. 35, chorus a cappella (1975)
 Symphony No. 3 'Symphony of Sorrowful Songs', Op. 36, soprano and orchestra (1976)
 Three little pieces, Op. 37, violin, piano (1977)
 Beatus Vir Psalm Op. 38, chorus and orchestra (1979)
 Szeroka Woda (Broad Waters), Op. 39, chorus a cappella (1979)
 No. 1 A ta nasza Narew – O our Narew River
 No. 2 Oj, kiedy na Powiślu – Oh, When in Powiśle
 No. 3 Oj, Janie, Janie – Oh, Johnny, Johnny
 No. 4 Polne róże rwała – She was Picking Wild Roses
 No. 5 Szeroka woda – Broad Waters
 Harpsichord/Piano Concerto, Op. 40, harpsichord/piano and orchestra (1980)
 Mazurkas for piano, Op. 41
 Two Songs, Op. 42
 No. 1 Nokturn – Nocturne
 No. 2 Malaguena
 Blessed Raspberry Songs, Op. 43, voice and piano (1980)
 No. 1 Błogosławione pieśni malinowe – Blessed Raspberry Songs
 No. 2 Co ranek, skoro ustępują cienie – Each Morning, when the Shadows Recede
 No. 3 Litość – Compassion
 No. 4 O! Boże . . . jeden, który JESTEŚ – Oh, God...the One who IS"
 Miserere, Op. 44, chorus a cappella (1981)
 "Wieczór ciemny się uniża" for a cappella choir, Op. 45 (1981)
 No. 1 Pytają się ludzie – People are Asking
 No. 2 Uwiją, wianuczki – They will Make Little Garlands
 No. 3 Ścięli dąbek – They Felled the Little Oak Tree
 No. 4 Depce konik – The little Horse Paws the Ground
 No. 5 Wieczór ciemny się uniż a – Dark Evening is Falling
 My Vistula, grey Vistula, Op. 46, chorus a cappella (1981)
 Lullabies and Dances for violin and piano, Op. 47 (1982)
 Songs to Words by J. Słowacki, Op. 48 (1983)
 No. 1 We łzach, Panie, ręce podnosimy do Ciebie – In Tears, Lord, We Raise our Hands to You
 No. 2 Panie! O którym na niebosach słyszę – Lord! Of Whom in the Heavens I Hear
 Three Lullabies, Op. 49, Mixed Voices (1984)
 No. 1 Uśnijże mi, uśnij – Sleep for Me, Sleep
 No. 2 Kołysz-że się kołysz – Rock, Rock
 No. 3 Nie piej, kurku, nie piej – Don't Crow, Rooster, Don't Crow
 "Ach, mój wianku lewandowy, for a cappella choir, Op. 50
 No. 1 Ach, mój wianku lewandowy – O, My Garland of Lavender
 No. 2 Wędrowali trzy panienki – Three Lasses were Wandering
 No. 3 Taiłam się – I have Kept Silent
 No. 4 Bzi, bzi, bzibziana –
 No. 5 Chcecie wiedzieć – Do You Want to Know
 No. 6 Po cożeś mę, matuleńku, za mąż wydała – Why did You Marry Me off, Mummy
 No. 7 Dajże, Boże, plonowało – Give Us, God, Good Harvest]
 "Idzie chmura, pada deszcz" for a cappella choir, Op. 51
 No. 1 Idzie chmura, pada deszcz – The Cloud Comes, Rain Falls
 No. 2 Gdzie to jedziesz, Jaszu? – Where are You Going, Johnny?
 No. 3 Kiedy będzie słońce i pogoda – When It Will be Sunny and Warm
 No. 4 Szła sierotka po wsi – An Orphan Girl Walked through a Village
 No. 5 Czas nam do domu, dziewczyno – Time for Us to Go Home, Girl
 Sundry Pieces for piano, Op. 52 (1956–1961)
 Lerchenmusik, Op. 53, clarinet, cello and piano (1986)
 Five Marian Songs, Op. 54, chorus a cappella (1985)
 No. 1 Matko niebieskiego Pana – Mother of the Heavenly Lord
 No. 2 Matko Najświętsza! – Most Holy Mother!
 No. 3 Zdrowaś bądź Maria! – Hail Mary!
 No. 4 Ach, jak smutna jest rozstanie – Oh, How Sad is the Parting
 No. 5 Ciebie na wieki wychalać będziemy – We Shall Praise You Forever
 Two Marian Hymns, solo voices a cappella, no Op. number (1986)
 "O Domina Nostra", Op. 55, soprano and organ (1985)
 "Pod Twoją obronę", Op. 56, a cappella choir (1984)
 Na Aniol Panski, Op. 57, chorus a cappella (1986)
 For You, Anne-Lill, Op. 58, flute and piano (1986)
 Aria, Op. 59, tuba, piano, tam-tam and bass drum (1987)
 Totus Tuus, Op. 60 (1987)
 "Przybądź Duchu Święty", a cappella choir, Op. 61 (1988)
 Already it is Dusk, Op. 62, string quartet (1988)
 Good Night, Op. 63, soprano, alto flute, piano, three tam-tams (1990)
 Intermezzo, piano (1990, no Op. number)
 Quasi una fantasia, Op. 64, string quartet (1991)
 Concerto-Cantata, flute and orchestra, Op. 65 (1992)
 Kleines Requiem für eine Polka, Op. 66, piano and 13 instruments (1993)
 ...songs are sung, Op. 67, string quartet (1995/2005)
 Three Songs of Maria Konopnicka, Op. 68, voice and piano (1954/95)
Three Fragments to Words by Stanisław Wyspiański, Op. 69, voice and piano (1995–1996)
 No. 1 Jakżeż ja się uspokoję – How on Earth Can I Be at Peace
 No. 2 Może z mętów się dobędzie człowieka – Perhaps from these Dregs a Man Will Emerge
 No. 3 Poezjo! – tyś to jest spolojną siestą – Poetry! – You are a Calm Siesta
 Valentine piece, Op. 70, flute and bell (1996)
 Piece for clarinet and string quartet, Op. 71, (1996)
 Sanctus Adalbertus, Op. 72, for soprano, baritone, mixed choir, and symphony orchestra (World Premier Nov. 4, 2015, Krakow)
 Little Fantasia, Op. 73, violin and piano (1997)
 Five Kurpian Songs, Op. 75, chorus a cappella (1999)
 Lobgesang, Op. 76, chorus a cappella (2000)
 "Niech Nam Żyją i Śpiewają", chorus a cappella, Op. 77 (2000)
 Quasi una fantasia, Op. 78, string orchestra version of Op. 64 (2002)
 Dla Jasiunia, Op. 79, violin and piano (2003)
 The Song of Rodziny Katynskie, Op. 81, chorus a cappella (2004)
 Kyrie, Op. 83
 Selected Sacred Songs, for Unaccompanied Mixed Choir, Op. 84 (1986, pub. 2013)
 No. 1 Zdrowaś Bądź Maryja
 No. 2 Idźmy, Tulmy Się Jak Dziatki
 No. 3  Szczęśliwy, Kto Sobie Patrona
 No. 4 Ludu, Mój Ludu
 No. 5 Witaj Pani, Matko Matki
 No. 6 Zawitaj Pani Świata
 No. 7 Bądź Pozdrowiony
 No. 8 Jezu Chryste, Panie Miły
 No. 9 O Matko Miłościwa
 No. 10 Pozdrawiajmy, Wychwalajmy
 No. 11 Święty, Święty, Święty
 No. 12 Tysiąckroć Bądź Pozdrowiona
 No. 13 Krzyknijmy Wszyscy
 No. 14 Wstał Pan Chrystus z Martwych
 No. 15 Śliczny Jezu, Miły Panie
 No. 16 Twoja Cześć, Chwała
 No. 17 Ojcze Boże Wszechmogący
 No. 18 Krzyżu Chrystusa
 No. 19 Ciebie Wzywamy, Ciebie Błagamy (No date given)
 No. 20 Witaj Jutrzenko (No date given)
 Symphony No. 4 "Tansman Episodes", Op. 85 (2006–2009), completed by the composer's son Mikołaj Górecki

Unpublished

Górecki's unpublished works prior to 1956 include: Legenda for orchestra, five mazurkas for piano, a prelude for violin and piano, ten preludes for piano, two songs ("Przez te łąki. przez te pola" and "Kiedy Polska"), a Terzetto quasi una fantasia for oboe, violin and piano, a romance for piano, a string quartet, Obratzki poetyckie for piano and a piano concerto. These don't have opus numbers.

One scholar assigns Op. number 9a to a suite for piano titled "Z ptasiego gniazda" ("From the Bird's Nest") which Górecki wrote November 1956. Earlier that year, Górecki set to music a translation to Polish of one of Federico García Lorca's poems by Mikołaj Bieszczadowski, but Górecki revised it in 1980 and it was published with another translated Lorca poem as the two songs of Op. 42.

References

Sources
 Thomas, Adrian. 1997. Górecki. Oxford Studies of Composers. Oxford: Clarendon Press; New York: Oxford University Press.

External links
 Boosey & Hawkes Catalogue Search for all compositions by Górecki, Henryk Mikolaj
https://polishmusic.usc.edu/research/composers/henryk-mikolaj-gorecki/

Gorecki, Henryk Mikolaj